St. Mary's University is a private Roman Catholic university in San Antonio, Texas. Founded by the Society of Mary (Marianists) in 1852, St. Mary's is the oldest Catholic university in Texas and the American Southwest. 

With a student population of nearly 4,000, St. Mary's is home to a College of Arts, Humanities and Social Sciences; School of Science, Engineering and Technology; the Greehey School of Business; and the St. Mary's University School of Law.

History

Founded as St. Mary's Institute, the school opened on Aug. 25, 1852, with a faculty of five and an enrollment of twelve boys. In 1921 all college classes were transferred from downtown to the St. Louis College campus. In 1923, St. Louis College became St. Mary's College with an enrollment of twelve in the freshman class. Grade school and high school students remained at the downtown school, which adopted the name St. Mary's Academy. The new St. Mary's College quickly gained senior college status and in 1927 the first class of bachelor's degree candidates graduated from the newly renamed St. Mary's University.

In 1932, the high school programs at St. Mary's Academy relocated from the College Street campus to become Central Catholic High School. After over a century as an all-male institution, St. Mary's opened its doors to female students in 1963 and became a coeducational university. In 1987, Polish-American silent film star Pola Negri left most of her estate to St. Mary's University, including a collection of memorabilia and several rare prints of her films. St. Mary's University also set up a scholarship in her name.

Academics

St. Mary's is accredited by the Southern Association of Colleges and Schools. In addition, the Greehey School of Business is accredited by the Association to Advance Collegiate Schools of Business (AACSB). Electrical and industrial engineering programs in the School of Science, Engineering and Technology are recognized through accreditation by the Accreditation Board for Engineering and Technology (ABET).

Law school

In October 1927, the San Antonio Bar Association established the San Antonio School of Law, and for seven years after its founding was administered by a board of governors under the control of the bar association. Until the School of Law became associated with a physical campus, classes were held at the Bexar County Courthouse. In an attempt to maximize educational and material resources of the fledgling institution, the Board of Governors negotiated with St. Mary's University regarding a transfer of the School of Law's administrative control. The transfer was completed on October 1, 1934, and St. Mary's University School of Law was officially established.

The School of Law was then housed at St. Mary's University's then downtown campus at 112 College Street, situated near the San Antonio River Walk. Possessing several military bases, San Antonio experienced a surge of population and industry in the years immediately following World War II. This exponential growth resulted in more law students. To meet these new demands adequately, the School of Law organized itself to meet the requirements of the American Bar Association and the Association of American Law Schools. It received accreditation from the ABA in February 1948 and became a member of the AALS in December 1949.

On December 19, 1967, the School of Law relocated from the College Street campus to join the main campus of St. Mary's. A multimillion-dollar expansion project had provided for the addition of eight new buildings to the main University campus, including a lecture hall, law library, and faculty building comprising the Law Center. The school held its first classes the next month, in January 1968.

Since 1968, the school has had several structures rededicated, renovated, or expanded, including the Law Administration Building, housing the office of the dean; the Law Classroom Building; and the Sarita Kenedy East Law Library, dedicated in 1984 after the John G. and Marie Stella Kenedy Memorial Foundation gave the School of Law $7.5 million to fund its construction in January 1982.

Athletics

St. Mary's University is a member of NCAA Division II and the Lone Star Conference and sponsors 12 men's and women's sports at the varsity level. St. Mary's has won four team national championships in men's basketball (1989), baseball (2001), softball (1986 and 2002), and one individual national title in men's golf (2006). In 2020, St. Mary's launched an E-Sports team.

Student life
There are a total of 68 registered organizations. During the beginning of the semester, the Office of Resident Life, in cooperation with student organizations, hosts a "Rattler Round Up" for incoming freshmen and other students. 

Most of the students live in one of the 13 residence halls. These halls are divided among upper and lower classmen with some being mixed, but no strict enforcement is placed upon the assignment of rooms.

Events
In April, St. Mary's University and the city of San Antonio plays host to Fiesta San Antonio. On campus, the university hosts Oyster Bake, a combination of concerts, food stalls, and carnival rides. The university has played host to the event since 1916 and it has since become a major event in the city culturally and economically. The event is open to students, who are also able to participate in "Rattler Fest" which is a exclusive festival for St. Mary's students prior to the larger Oyster Bake.

Greek Life
St. Mary's University is home to twelve Greek organizations, no Greek organization is permitted to have a house due to a city ordinance preventing boarding homes. Every Friday Greek Life hosts "Quad" where every active social fraternity and sorority hangout in the morning behind St. Louis Hall.

Many of the events that are open to the entire campus are organized by the campus' IFC chapter. The IFC operates as a regulatory body upon all fraternities on campus, and is the primary link between the school administration and the independent student organized and operated fraternities.

Fraternities and sororities on campus include:
Kappa Sigma 
Sigma Phi Epsilon
Sigma Lambda Beta
Alpha Sigma Phi
Chi Phi
Alpha Sigma Tau
Alpha Phi
Sigma Sigma Sigma
Delta Zeta
Alpha Phi Omega
Omega Delta Phi
Kappa Delta Chi
Beta Sigma Phi
Delta Sigma Pi

Notable alumni

Politics, law, and service

 Fernando Andrade, M.A. 1979, Congressman at the Congress of the Republic of Peru (2011–2016) and former Mayor of the Miraflores District, Lima (1996–1999 and 2003–2006)
 Stuart Bowen, J.D. 1991, Special Inspector General for Iraq Reconstruction
 Leonel Castillo, B.A. 1961,  Houston City Comptroller, 1972, Commissioner Immigration Naturalization Services, 1977 
 James R. Clapper Jr., M.S. 1970, Political Science, Director of National Intelligence
 Tom Corbett, J.D. 1975, former governor of Pennsylvania and the state's former attorney general
 John Cornyn, J.D. 1977, U.S. Senator from Texas; former justice, Texas Supreme Court; St. Mary's Distinguished Law School Graduate (1994)
 David Alan Ezra, B.B.A. 1969, J.D., 1972, Senior Judge, United States District Court for the Western District of Texas, former Chief Judge, United States District Court for the District of Hawaii
 Rick Galindo, B.S. in Finance and Risk Management, c. 2003, Republican member of the Texas House of Representatives from District 117 in Bexar County 
 Delia Garcia, M.A., 2004, First Latina and youngest female legislator at age 27 elected to the Kansas House of Representatives, 2004 
 Charlie Gonzalez, J.D. 1972, U.S. Congressman
 Henry B. Gonzalez, LL.B. 1943, former U.S. Congressman
 Paul W. Green, J.D. 1977, Texas Supreme Court Justice
 Thad Heartfield, B.A. 1962, J.D. 1965, chief judge for the United States District Court for the Eastern District of Texas
 Glenn Hegar, M.A., Texas state senator since 2007; Member of the Texas House from 2003 to 2007, candidate for Comptroller of Public Accounts in 2014 Republican primary election
 Peter Kinder, J.D. 1979, lieutenant governor of Missouri
 Nico LaHood, J.D. 2002, former District Attorney of Bexar County, Texas
 Alma Lopez, J.D. 1968, Chief Justice, Texas Fourth Court of Appeals
 Frank L. Madla, B.A. 1959, M.A. 1962, Texas state senator and representative
 Marina Marmolejo, M.A., J.D. 1996, District Judge, United States District Court for the Southern District of Texas
 Michael McCaul, J.D. 1987, U.S. Congressman
 Scott McInnis, J.D. 1980, U.S. Congressman
 Mario G. Obledo, LL.B. 1960, co-founder of the Mexican American Legal Defense and Education Fund
 Tony Sanchez, B.A. 1965, J.D. 1969, unsuccessful candidate for governor of Texas, 2002 gubernatorial election
 Frank M. Tejeda, B.A. 1970, Texas state representative, Texas state senator, U.S. Congressman
 Alfred Valenzuela, B.A. 1970, M.A. 1979, United States Army major general
 Willie Velasquez, B.A. Civil Right Activist, Founder Southwest Voter Registration Education Project, posthumously awarded Presidential Medal of Freedom 1995 
 Don S. Wenger, U.S. Air Force major general
 Nelson Wolff, B.B.A. and J.D. 1966, Texas representative, senator, San Antonio mayor, Bexar County judge
 Kevin Patrick Yeary, B.A. 1988, Law 1991, judge of the Texas Court of Criminal Appeals in San Antonio

Business
 Benjamin Biaggini, B.S. 1936, former president of the Southern Pacific Company, parent company of Southern Pacific Railroad
 William E. Greehey, B.S. 1960, founder of Valero Energy Corporation and NuStar Energy. The Greehey School of Business was named in his honor in 2005.
 Elaine King, B.A., financial planner and public speaker
 Felix Stehling, co-founder of Taco Cabana

Religion
 Michael Joseph Boulette, B.A. 1971, Auxiliary Bishop of San Antonio (2017-)
 J. Arturo Cepeda, M.A. 2001, Auxiliary Bishop of Detroit
 Richard Gaillardetz, M.A. 1984, Joseph McCarthy Chair of Catholic Systematic Theology at Boston College
 Bernard Ferdinand Popp, M.A. 1975, Auxiliary Bishop Emeritus of San Antonio
 Raymond Roussin, S.M., B.A. 1960, first Marianist archbishop, Archbishop of Vancouver 2004–09

Athletics
 Melvin Allys "Bert" Gallia, Class of 1911, former Major League Baseball pitcher for the Washington Senators, St. Louis Browns and Philadelphia Phillies
 Danny Heep, former Major League Baseball outfielder and 1988 World Series Champion
 George Koch, American football player
 Jeff Kubenka, B.A. 1996, former Major League Baseball pitcher
 Robert Reid, B.A. 1977, former National Basketball Association player for the Houston Rockets, Charlotte Hornets, Portland Trail Blazers, and Philadelphia 76ers
 Marcus Session, B.A. 2004, former National Basketball Association (pre-season) and International Basketball Federation player

Arts, entertainment, and media
 Theodore Albrecht, B.M.E. 1967, musicologist
 Brian Anderson, broadcaster for the Milwaukee Brewers
 Charles Fincher, J.D. 1971, American cartoonist ("Thadeus & Weez") 
 Larry Levinson, B.A. 1979, executive producer of more than 160 made-for-television movies
 Bobby Pulido, Class of 1995, Mexican-American Tejano music recording artist
 John Quiñones, B.A. 1974, ABC News correspondent and co-anchor of ABC News' Primetime
 John Santikos, B.A. 1949, movie theater entrepreneur

Education
 Mary Lynne Gasaway Hill, B.A. 1986, M.A. 1990, M.A. 1991, American poet, writer and professor
 José Ángel Gutiérrez 1968, attorney, co-founder of the Mexican American Youth Organization, president of Raza Unida Party, professor at the University of Texas at Arlington

References

External links

 
 St. Mary's Athletics website
 

 
Marianist universities and colleges
Educational institutions established in 1852
Universities and colleges accredited by the Southern Association of Colleges and Schools
Universities and colleges in San Antonio
Catholic universities and colleges in Texas
Association of Catholic Colleges and Universities
1852 establishments in Texas